Street Song(s) may refer to:

Music
Street Songs (album), by Rick James, 1981
Street Songs, an album by the King's Singers with Evelyn Glennie, 1998
Street Song, two 1988 compositions for brass by Michael Tilson Thomas
"Street Song", a song by the Who from Who, 2019

Other uses
The Street Song, a 1931 German film
Street Song (film), a 1935 British film
Street Songs, a 1942 poetry collection by Edith Sitwell

See also
Street Music (disambiguation)
Street singer (disambiguation)